Yan Bingyan is a Chinese film and television actress. She is the descendant of Yan Hui.

Filmography

Television series

Film

Accolades

References

External links
 

1972 births
Living people
Chinese film actresses
Chinese television actresses
21st-century Chinese actresses
20th-century Chinese actresses
Actresses from Beijing